Transtillaspis atheles is a species of moth of the family Tortricidae. It is found in Colombia.

The wingspan is about 18 mm. The ground colour of the forewings is yellowish cream, dotted with brown and with weak pale yellowish-brown suffusions. The hindwings are cream brown, spotted with brownish.

Etymology
The species name refers to the asymmetry of the sacculi and is derived from Greek atheles (meaning imperfect).

References

Moths described in 2011
Transtillaspis
Taxa named by Józef Razowski